Elk Fork or Elkfork may refer to:

Elkfork, Kentucky, an unincorporated community
Elk Fork (Muddy Creek), a stream in Missouri
Elk Fork (South Grand River), a stream in Missouri
Elk Fork (Point Pleasant Creek), a stream in West Virginia